Muhammad Fazil (15 November 1926 – 21 May 2018) was a Pakistani sprinter. He competed in the men's 4 × 100 metres relay at the 1952 Summer Olympics, where he, together with the Pakistan national team, qualified for the semifinals but was eliminated before the final.

References

1926 births
2018 deaths
Athletes (track and field) at the 1952 Summer Olympics
Pakistani male sprinters
Olympic athletes of Pakistan
Place of birth missing
20th-century Pakistani people